Canzone d'Amore is a studio album from Kikki Danielsson, released in June 1989. The album reached #48 place at the Swedish album chart.

Track listing

Side A

Side B

Contributing musicians
Kikki Danielsson, vocals
Per Lindvall, drums
Sam Bengtsson, bass
Hasse Rosén, guitar
Peter Ljung, keyboard

Charts

References

External links

1989 albums
Kikki Danielsson albums